Chitlang (Nepali:चित्लाङ, Nepal Bhasa:चिलं/चिलिम]) is a village located in Thaha Municipality of Makwanpur District, Bagmati Province, Nepal.  
Religions of chitlang

Geography
Chitlang sits southwest of Kathmandu valley in the Mahabharat range.

The Chitlang Thaha Municipality  is bounded by
North: Dhunibesi Municipality, Chandragiri Municipality
South: Indrasarobar Rural Municipality
East: Indrasarobar Rural Municipality, Chandragiri Municipality
West: Former Bajrabarahi myc

History
Chitlang myu is located in the ancient Newar settlement. Inscriptions dating back to the Lichchavi era were found there. There was confusion among Nepali Historian about whether Licchavi King Udaydev was throned or not but the inscriptions at Ganeshthan of Chilang Village proved that he was made king that time.

An inscription was found in Toukhel, former Ward 6 of Chitlang VDC, established by king Amshubarma (in sambat 37) (now ward no 10 of Thaha Municipality). According to the inscription, Amshubarma had given the land to shepherds and established a settlement for shepherds in Toukhel, Nhulgaun and Kunchhal of Chitlang. Some historians believe that these people, called Gopalis are the descendants of rulers of the Gopal era.

Chitlang hosts multiple cultures: the Tamang culture is in former ward no. 1. In ward no. 2 Khas (Newar, Tamang and Brahmin) mix culture. In former wards 3, 4, 5, and 6 the Newari culture is found; wards 8, 7 and 9 have a mixed culture.

Attractions 

Attractions include "Majhagau" especially (Ashoka chaitya) for Newari people and culture, Swachchhanda Vairav Temple, Satdhaea (sat dhara) vendafarm and organic village resort. A goat cheese factory is present. Other Attractions Getting close to Nature, Hike, Exploring Neighbourhood.

Demographics
According to the 2013 census of Nepal, Chitland has an approximate population of 7,680 people. The main ethnic populations are Newar, Tamang, Khas and Brahmins.

Culture 
Chitlang has a rich Newar culture. The Chitlang dialect of Nepal Bhasa is spoken almost exclusively in this region. The Balami language is one such language.

Getting there 
There are several means to reach Chitlang from the capital city and with the introduction of a cable car to the top of the ridge, one can reduce the hike to just going downhill from the top after a short ride. Buses and smaller vehicles leave from Kathmandu and reach Taukhel near Chitlang via Kulekhani. Chitlang is an easy one hour walk from Taukhel. Buses from Hetauda go all the way to Chitlang also via Kulekhani and leave for Hetauda in the morning. Above Thankot is a settlement known as Godam from where some pickup vehicles leave for Chitlang in the morning and go via the Chandragiri pass; it's the shortest route taking about an hour. One set of buses travel via Pharping near Dakshinkali and takes about three hours but don't reach Chitlang, with Taukhel being the closest point. The other vehicles take the old Tribhuvan Highway to reach Kulekhani. The pick-up vehicles to Kathmandu from Chitlang leave in the morning while the bus leaves from Taukhel in the afternoon.

Accommodation
There are several homestays that are controlled by the Home Stay Association (the office is beside the main road) which decides the rates and where the guests should stay.

See also
Makwanpur District
Bagmati Province
Nepal

References

Newar
Populated places in Makwanpur District